The 2021–22 season is PT Prachuap F.C.'s fourth season in the top tier of the Thai football league system, Thai League 1. On this season, PT Prachuap F.C. participate in 3 official competitions, Thai League 1, Chang FA Cup and Toyota League Cup.

Kit
Supplier: Grand Sport  Shirt sponsorship: PTG Energy

Managerial changes

Players

Current squad

Foreign players registration

The number of foreign players is restricted to five per Thai League team (3 foreign players, 1 AFC player and 3 ASEAN players). A team can use up to 5 foreign players on the field in each game, max 3 foreign players, 1 player from AFC country and 1 for ASEAN players.

Note: Flags indicate national team as has been registered to the official Thai League T1. Players may hold more than one FIFA and non-FIFA nationality.

Season Friendly Matches

Competitions

Overview

Thai League 1

League table

Results by matchday

Matches

Thai FA Cup

Matches

Thai League Cup

Matches

Season Transfers

In

Out

Loan in

Loan out

Notes

References

External links

PT Prachuap F.C. seasons
Association football in Thailand lists
PTP